David Winder may refer to:

 David F. Winder (1946–1970), United States Army Vietnam War medic posthumously awarded the Medal of Honor
 David Kent Winder (1932–2009), United States federal judge
 David Winder (artist) (1824–1912), British portrait painter